The Umma–Lagash war (also referred to as wars (plural), a dispute, border conflict, border war, environmental dispute, hostilities, and squabble) took place in Sumer's Early Dynastic III period (2600–2350 BCE) in present-day southern Iraq. It was caused by the city of Umma infringing upon an old border treaty with neighbouring city-state Lagash regarding a fertile piece of land coveted by both. It has also been nicknamed the Sumerian "Hundred Years War".

Cause 
Umma was the "neighbour and antagonist" of Lagash due to competing claims over water sources and the supply of water. The two cities had begun disputing over a fertile area called Gu-Edin or the 'Edge of the Plain', which led to a border treaty dating back to 2550–2600 BCE drawn up by King Mesilim of Kish  (though perhaps the agreement is as old as 3100 BCE). However, Umma began encroaching on Lagash's territory which reignited the dispute and led to a war. The war began around 2450 BCE. Aspects of the war were documented and preserved on historical objects like the Stele of the Vultures, as Sumerian scribes had begun writing with cuneiform and clay tablets 1000 years earlier.

Details 
The king of Lagash told his City God Ningursu of the casus belli and asked him to strike the enemy down; according to inscriptions Ningursu came to the king in a dream and promised victory. The soldiers on both of the sides were equipped with bronze axes and long spears with sharp metal points. The King of Lagash diverted water from his region to canals and dried ditches to deprive Umma of water. One of the key events was the Sack of Lagash in which several "deeds of sacrilege" were committed.

Resolution 
Around 2400 BCE, Entemena or Eannatum (sources differ), king of Lagash, had a marble pillar (the Stele of the Vultures) erected to establish a border between the warring city states of Lagash and Umma and stake his claim to the territory. He "set aside a fallow strip of land on the Umma side of the boundary ditch as a no-man's land". The king of Umma was required to swear an oath to multiple gods and the Lagash king, and to promise not to push into their lands. The Cone of Entenema offers additional records on this war.

The losses for Umma were probably 100–200 (the majority of their army) while Lagash casualties were minimal.

Discovery 
The marble pillar sat in the British Museum for 150 years until 2018 when Irving Finkel, a curator in the Middle East department, deciphered the Sumerian cuneiform to reveal details of the war.

The Eannatum Boulder – a contemporary Mesopotamian limestone sculpture that is currently at the Louvre – writes of the Lagash ruler: "Umma he defeated, and its 20 tumuli he heaped up". It also refers to Ningirsu (or Ninursa) a protector god who was called upon to aid Lagash in their battle against Umma.

Legacy 
Professor of History Lorenzo Kamel deemed it the first recorded war in human history. Including the earliest battle currently known to history, it is perhaps the first authentically recorded military campaign in the history of the world. The Stele of the Vultures is one of the very first visual representations pertaining to warfare that has been discovered. Irene J. Winter, a professor emeritus at Harvard University, said the pillar "stands at the beginning of a long line of historical narratives in the history of art." Rachel Campbell-Johnston at The Times reports it is likely the earliest written evidence of a border dispute and is also the first time the term "no man's land" is used. Marking the end to the Umma–Lagash war, the Stele of the Vultures is described as "the best record of the world's oldest boundary treaty". The monument also depicts the first recorded likenesses of ancient soldiers.

Territorial Leasing in Diplomacy and International Law notes the known inscriptions come from Lagash and therefore only represent its perspective. The Atlas of Military History argues that Lagash's victory over Umma is a more accurate historical record of early Mesopotamian combat than the Uruk or Kish, though it is less well-known. Daily Life in Ancient Mesopotamia asserted that King Mesilim's original treaty seems to favour Lagash over Umma.

The six-deep phalanx-like dense formation of the soldiers "astonished" modern scholars upon its reveal, as it was previously assumed that this army formation was a signature of the Ancient Greeks almost 2000 years later.

Notes

References

Further reading 
 Historia del Cercano Oriente, page 70

See also 

 Sumer–Elam war

Early Dynastic Period (Mesopotamia)
Umma
3rd-millennium BC conflicts